St. Peter and St. Pauls' Cathedral, Glendalough is a former cathedral in the Republic of Ireland: it is within the same enclosure as Our Lady's Church and the Round Tower. 

Adam Loftus, 1st Viscount Loftus, was appointed Archdeacon of the Cathedral in 1604, and retained the office until his death in 1643, despite objections from the Archbishop of Canterbury.

Notes

Churches in County Wicklow
History of County Wicklow
Glenndalocha
National Monuments in County Wicklow
Roman Catholic pilgrimage sites in Ireland
Former cathedrals in Ireland
Former churches in the Republic of Ireland